Harriette Beanland was a British textile worker and Suffragette and secretary to the Women's Labour League branch in Nelson in Lancashire.

Biography 
Harriett Beanland was born on 5th November, 1866, in Chester, where her father, Bolton Beanland was based during his transfer from Jamaica to Gibraltar whilst working for the British army. Her father, Bolton, was originally from Colne in Lancashire. He died at the young age of 33, and her mother, Emma Saword, also passed away aged 38. So Harriett was orphaned in 1876 and was then under the care of her uncle, Emmett Beanland, in Gibraltar. She wrote an extensive diary based around 1874-1976 whilst living in Gibraltar. Harriett Mary Beanland worked as a textile worker in Lancashire when she moved back to England to live closer to Bolton’s family. She was a member of the British Independent Labour Party (ILP). Appointed Poor Law Guardian for the City of Nelson, she worked to enforce the Poor Laws which related to the provision of financial assistance to the poorest in England and the rest of the United Kingdom between the 16th and 19th centuries.

In 1906, Beanland signed the manifesto of the Independent Labour Party in favour of women's suffrage. She joined the Nelson & Clitheroe Suffrage Society alongside Mary Atkinson and Margaret Aldersley, as well as the National Industrial and Professional Women's Suffrage Society. She became secretary of the branch of the Women's Labour League in Nelson in 1900 until its dissolution a year later.

From 1914 and the start of the First World War, some suffragettes of the Women's Social and Political Union (WSPU) left the movement in disagreement with the support shown for the fighting.  A week after the start of the war, Beanland sent a letter to the Nelson Leader '' denouncing the support:

See also 
 Women's suffrage
 Suffragette
 List of suffragists and suffragettes
Feminism in the United Kingdom

References 

British suffragists
People from Nelson, Lancashire
Year of birth missing
Year of death missing